Madison Maersk is one of the largest very large container vessels (VLCV) in the world. The ship is Maersk Triple E class and was built in 2014 by Daewoo Shipbuilding & Marine Engineering in South Korea. The ship was ordered together with her sister ships Magleby Maersk, Maribo Maersk, Marstal Maersk, Matz Maersk and Mayview Maersk. With improved architecture and more powerful engineering and propulsion system, the ship achieves better dynamic characteristics and lower fuel consumption. The ship has capacity for 18,270 TEU and is accommodated with 1800 reefer plugs.

Design
Madison Maersk has Class ✠A1, Container Carrier, HIMP, ✠AMS, ✠ACCU, MAN-A, NBLES, TCM, FL 25, SH, SH-DLA, BWT+,ENVIRO +, GP, SHCM and is classified by American Bureau Of Shipping.

Engineering
The very large container vessel Madison Maersk  is equipped with two 8-cylinders ultra long-stroke engines MAN B&W 8S80ME-C 9.2 with total output power of 59,360 kW.

See also
 Container Ship
 List of largest container ships
 CSCL Globe
 Magleby Maersk

References 

2013 ships
Container ships
Merchant ships of Denmark
Ships of the Maersk Line